Jon Alan Barry (born July 25, 1969) is an American former basketball player and current television analyst for ABC and ESPN.

Biography
Barry is the son of Hall of Famer Rick Barry and Pam Connolly, and has three brothers: Scooter, Brent, and Drew, all of whom are also basketball players. Jon played his high school basketball at De La Salle High School in Concord, California. He then played one year each at University of the Pacific and Paris Junior College, before receiving a basketball scholarship to attend Georgia Tech in Atlanta, Georgia.

Out of Georgia Tech, he was selected in the first round of the 1992 NBA draft by the Boston Celtics, but refused to sign a contract and sat out the season. The Celtics traded their rights to him, mid season, to the Milwaukee Bucks for Alaa Abdelnaby. Barry joined the Milwaukee Bucks, who finished last, tied for last, and 2nd to last in their division Barry's first three years in the NBA.

Off to a slow start of a career as primarily a backup player, Barry did get chances to contribute to playoff runs of some good teams (scored 739 points in 82 appearances with the 2001–2002 Central Division champion Detroit Pistons) and scored 326 career playoff points in 63 NBA playoff games over 14 seasons. He had two games with 5 three-point shots and had six games with 5 steals, and has 5,041 season and playoff points total.

In addition to the Milwaukee Bucks and Detroit Pistons, Jon played for the Atlanta Hawks, Los Angeles Lakers, Golden State Warriors, Sacramento Kings, Denver Nuggets and most recently the Houston Rockets. Barry had 12 first-half points in a 3-minute span in the deciding game 5 of the first round of the 2002 NBA playoffs in the Detroit Pistons' series against the Toronto Raptors. Barry left the Pistons after the 2002–03 season, and was also released from the Rockets on March 1, 2006, which marked the end of his NBA playing career.

NBA career statistics

Regular season

|-
| align="left" | 1992–93
| align="left" | Milwaukee
| 47 || 0 || 11.7 || .369 || .333 || .673 || 0.9 || 1.4 || 0.7 || 0.1 || 4.4
|-
| align="left" | 1993–94
| align="left" | Milwaukee
| 72 || 7 || 17.3 || .414 || .278 || .795 || 2.0 || 2.3 || 1.4 || 0.2 || 6.2
|-
| align="left" | 1994–95
| align="left" | Milwaukee
| 52 || 0 || 11.6 || .425 || .333 || .763 || 0.9 || 1.6 || 0.6 || 0.1 || 3.7
|-
| align="left" | 1995–96
| align="left" | Golden State
| 68 || 0 || 10.5 || .492 || .473 || .838 || 0.9 || 1.3 || 0.5 || 0.2 || 3.8
|-
| align="left" | 1996–97
| align="left" | Atlanta
| 58 || 8 || 16.6 || .407 || .387 || .804 || 1.7 || 2.0 || 0.9 || 0.1 || 4.9
|-
| align="left" | 1997–98
| align="left" | Los Angeles
| 49 || 1 || 7.6 || .365 || .295 || .931 || 0.8 || 1.0 || 0.5 || 0.1 || 2.5
|-
| align="left" | 1998–99
| align="left" | Sacramento
| 43 || 0 || 17.1 || .428 || .304 || .845 || 2.2 || 2.6 || 1.2 || 0.1 || 5.0
|-
| align="left" | 1999–00
| align="left" | Sacramento
| 62 || 1 || 20.7 || .465 || .429 || .922 || 2.6 || 2.4 || 1.2 || 0.1 || 8.0
|-
| align="left" | 2000–01
| align="left" | Sacramento
| 62 || 2 || 16.3 || .404 || .348 || .877 || 1.5 || 2.1 || 0.5 || 0.1 || 5.1
|-
| align="left" | 2001–02
| align="left" | Detroit
| 82 || 6 || 24.2 || .489 || .469 || .931 || 2.9 || 3.3 || 1.1 || 0.2 || 9.0
|-
| align="left" | 2002–03
| align="left" | Detroit
| 80 || 0 || 18.4 || .450 || .407 || .860 || 2.3 || 2.6 || 0.8 || 0.2 || 6.9
|-
| align="left" | 2003–04
| align="left" | Denver
| 57 || 9 || 19.3 || .404 || .370 || .845 || 2.2 || 2.6 || 1.0 || 0.1 || 6.2
|-
| align="left" | 2004–05
| align="left" | Atlanta
| 16 || 0 || 17.2 || .403 || .344 || .769 || 1.3 || 1.8 || 0.9 || 0.1 || 5.2
|-
| align="left" | 2004–05
| align="left" | Houston
| 53 || 2 || 23.2 || .447 || .451 || .897 || 2.6 || 2.6 || 0.9 || 0.1 || 7.0
|-
| align="left" | 2005-06
| align="left" | Houston
| 20 || 0 || 17.1 || .385 || .375 || .828 || 1.6 || 1.3 || 0.7 || 0.1 || 4.3
|- class="sortbottom"
| style="text-align:center;" colspan="2"| Career
| 821 || 36 || 16.9 || .434 || .392 || .848 || 1.8 || 2.2 || 0.9 || 0.1 || 5.7
|}

Playoffs

|-
| align="left" | 1996–97
| align="left" | Atlanta
| 2 || 0 || 4.5 || .000 || .000 || .000 || 0.0 || 0.0 || 0.0 || 0.0 || 0.0
|-
| align="left" | 1997–98
| align="left" | Los Angeles
| 7 || 0 || 2.6 || .000 || .000 || .000 || 0.3 || 0.0 || 0.1 || 0.0 || 0.0
|-
| align="left" | 1998–99
| align="left" | Sacramento
| 5 || 0 || 22.4 || .353 || .263 || .917 || 2.0 || 1.8 || 1.2 || 0.2 || 8.0
|-
| align="left" | 1999–00
| align="left" | Sacramento
| 5 || 0 || 20.4 || .429 || .583 || .875 || 2.4 || 2.4 || 0.6 || 0.0 || 7.8
|-
| align="left" | 2000–01
| align="left" | Sacramento
| 7 || 0 || 7.9 || .412 || .286 || .000 || 0.4 || 0.6 || 0.1 || 0.0 || 2.3
|-
| align="left" | 2001–02
| align="left" | Detroit
| 10 || 0 || 17.7 || .475 || .447 || .625 || 2.0 || 2.1 || 0.5 || 0.1 || 8.0
|-
| align="left" | 2002–03
| align="left" | Detroit
| 14 || 0 || 12.3 || .426 || .455 || 1.000 || 1.7 || 1.4 || 0.6 || 0.1 || 5.0
|-
| align="left" | 2003–04
| align="left" | Denver
| 5 || 1 || 20.0 || .333 || .333 || .667 || 3.6 || 2.0 || 0.6 || 0.0 || 4.2
|-
| align="left" | 2004–05
| align="left" | Houston
| 7 || 0 || 26.1 || .438 || .478 || .875 || 4.1 || 1.3 || 0.7 || 0.0 || 8.6
|- class="sortbottom"
| style="text-align:center;" colspan="2"| Career
| 62 || 1 || 15.0 || .404 || .403 || .857 || 1.9 || 1.4 || 0.5 || 0.0 || 5.3
|}

References

External links

 Jon Barry ESPN Bio

1969 births
Living people
American men's basketball players
American people of Lithuanian descent
Atlanta Hawks players
Basketball players from Oakland, California
Boston Celtics draft picks
Denver Nuggets players
Detroit Pistons players
Georgia Tech Yellow Jackets men's basketball players
Golden State Warriors players
Houston Rockets players
Los Angeles Lakers players
Milwaukee Bucks players
National Basketball Association broadcasters
Pacific Tigers men's basketball players
Paris Dragons basketball players
Sacramento Kings players
Shooting guards
De La Salle High School (Concord, California) alumni